Lisa Lieschke (born 6 October 1963) is a former synchronized swimmer from Australia.

References 

1963 births
Living people
Australian synchronised swimmers
Olympic synchronised swimmers of Australia
Synchronized swimmers at the 1988 Summer Olympics
Commonwealth Games medallists in synchronised swimming
Commonwealth Games bronze medallists for Australia
Synchronised swimmers at the 1986 Commonwealth Games
Synchronised swimmers at the 1990 Commonwealth Games
20th-century Australian women
21st-century Australian women
Medallists at the 1986 Commonwealth Games